Polemonium occidentale is a species of flowering plant in the phlox family known by the common names western polemonium and western Jacob's-ladder. There are two subspecies. The common ssp. occidentale is native to western North America from British Columbia to Colorado to California, where it can be found in moist areas of many habitat types, including meadows and woodlands. There is also a rare subspecies, ssp. lacustre, which is known only from a total of three counties in Minnesota and Wisconsin, and is found only in white cedar swamp habitat there.

This is a rhizomatous perennial herb producing an erect stem up to one meter tall. The leaves are located along the stem, each divided into many small lance-shaped leaflets. The inflorescence is an open, elongated array of several bell-shaped, five-lobed flowers each up to 1.5 centimeters long. The flower corolla is blue to bright purple with a white throat.

The rare subsp. lacustre faces threats including peat mining in its swamp habitat, herbivory by deer, and alterations in the local hydrology where it grows. There are only five populations of this subspecies.

References

External links
Jepson Manual Treatment: ssp. occidentale
Photo gallery

occidentale
Flora of North America